Oluseye Olympio (born 30 May 1990) is a Nigerian cricketer. He played in the 2013 ICC World Cricket League Division Six tournament.

References

External links
 

1990 births
Living people
Nigerian cricketers
Place of birth missing (living people)